The Austrian National Time Trial Championships are held annually as part of the Austrian National Cycling Championships, they decide the best cyclists in this discipline in Austria, across various categories.

The winners of each event are awarded with a symbolic cycling jersey which is red and white, just like the national flag, these colours can be worn by the rider at other time trialling events in the country to show their status as national champion. The champion's stripes can be combined into a sponsored rider's team kit design for this purpose.

Multiple winners

Men

Women

Men

Elite

Under 23

Women

Notes

References

External links
Men's results
Junior's results
Women's results

National road cycling championships
Cycle races in Austria
Recurring sporting events established in 1995
Cycling